Papi Gordo is the debut studio album by Guatemalan-American DJ and record producer Carnage, released on 30 November 2015. The album features three singles - "Bricks" featuring Migos, "WDYW" featuring Lil Uzi Vert, A$AP Ferg & Rich The Kid and "I Like Tuh" featuring ILOVEMAKONNEN.

Singles 
The first single "Bricks" featuring Migos was released on 17 June 2014. The official music video was uploaded by Ultra Record's YouTube channel one day later.

The second single "WDYW" featuring Lil Uzi Vert, A$AP Ferg & Rich The Kid was released on 27 January 2015. The official music video of "WDYW" was also posted on Ultra Record's YouTube channel on 23 February 2015.

The third single "I Like Tuh" featuring ILOVEMAKONNEN was released on 24 February 2015. Two official remixes of this song (one remix featuring Lil Wayne and G-Eazy while the other featuring Lincoln Jesser) were posted on Ultra Records' and Carnage's YouTube channels.

Other songs
Carnage collaborate with Australian DJ Timmy Trumpet and American DJ KSHMR in “Toca” as the first promotional single released on 10 July 2015.

“November Skies” was released on 9 October 2015 as the second promotional single. This is a collaboration with Tomas Barford featuring vocals of Nina Kinert.

Reception 
Robert Salusbury of Outloud Culture has stated that "Carnage’s debut album descends further and further into unoriginality and is a complete travesty that makes it all too clear that Carnage has swiftly gone from a pioneer of the hardstyle scene, producing some of the liveliest tracks that Spinnin’ Records has seen, to an embarrassing dinosaur of the EDM scene."

Track listing

Charts

References 

Carnage (DJ) albums
2015 debut albums